Leo Duyndam (Poeldijk, 2 January 1948 — Nice, France, 26 July 1990) was a Dutch professional road bicycle racer.

Major results

1967
Omloop der Kempen
1968
 National Track Pursuit Championship
Ronde van Limburg
Six Days of Ghent (with Peter Post)
1969
Bladel
Elfstedenronde
Goirle
Honselersdijk
Ede
1970
 National Track Pursuit Championship
Schinnen
Lutlommel
Berner Rundfahrt
Rotterdam Coolsingel
1971
Six Days of Antwerp (with René Pijnen and Peter Post)
Arendonk
Polderpijl
Ulvenhout
Roden
Papendrecht
Arnhem
1972
Grave
Maaslandse Pijl
Neeroeteren
Polder-Kempen
Six Days of Rotterdam (with René Pijnen)
Six Days of Antwerp (with René Pijnen and Theo Verschueren)
Six Days of Berlin (with René Pijnen)
Six Days of Frankfurt (with Jürgen Tschan)
Tour de France:
Winner stage 6
1973
Berlare
European Track Madison Championship (with René Pijnen)
Six Days of Rotterdam (with René Pijnen)
Six Days of Antwerp (with Gerard Koel and René Pijnen)
Zomergem
Six Days of London (with Gerben Karstens)
Six Days of München (with René Pijnen)
Six Days of Zürich (with Piet de Wit)
1974
 National Track Omnium Championship
Profronde van Pijnacker
Rummen
Six Days of Bremen (with René Pijnen)
Six Days of Rotterdam (with René Pijnen)
Knokke
Koksijde
Six Days of Herning (with Ole Ritter)
1975
Six Days of Rotterdam (with Gerben Karstens)
Six Days of Herning (with Ole Ritter)

External links 

Official Tour de France results for Leo Duyndam

1948 births
1990 deaths
Dutch male cyclists
Dutch Tour de France stage winners
People from Monster
Cyclists from South Holland
20th-century Dutch people